Ardab Mutiyaran is a 2019 Indian Punjabi-language romantic comedy drama film directed by Manav Shah. The film is produced by Gunbir Singh Sidhu and Manmord Sidhu under the banner White Hill Studios. Starring Sonam Bajwa, Mehreen Pirzada, Ajay Sarkaria and Ninja, the story of the film revolves around Babbu Bains (played by Sonam Bajwa), who fights evils of the society in her own style. She represents all the women, who fight for their own identity.

It was released on 18 October 2019.

Plot

Babbu Bains, a young, spirited and bold girl finds her calling as a recovery agent in a finance company (Chaddha Finance) run by another headstrong girl, Shruti. Babbu’s partner Vicky is always at the receiving end of Shruti’s wrath. Owing to their constant clashes, Shruti sends Babbu for a false recovery to bring her down. This results in Babbu meeting Rinku Bansal, an only bachelor in his house dominated by his sisters-in-law. Rinku falls head over heels in love with her at first sight. Rinku and Babbu get married and Vicky ends up tying the knot with Shruti. Vickey's household is dominated by his mother Sudesh as his dad is a hen-pecked husband. Thus, begins the epic saga of power play between these women both at their workplace and their respective homes. While the men try to make peace between them but end up being pulled at both the ends in this tug of war.

Cast
 Sonam Bajwa as Babbu Bains Bansal: Vicky's friend, Rinku's wife.
 Ajay Sarkaria as Rinku Bansal : Bittu's son, Babbu's husband.
 Mehreen Pirzada as Shruti Chadda Ahuja : Vicky 's wife.
Ninja as Vicky Ahuja: Anuja and Sudesh's son; Shruti's husband
B. N. Sharma as Ahuja
 Upasana Singh as Sudesh
 Sudesh Lehri as Bittu Bansal: Rinku's father; Babbu's father-in-law.
Rajeev Mehra as Sunil Bansal
Navneet Nishan as Darshana Chadda
 Inderpal Singh as Chadda Financer
 Chesta Bhagat as Saroj Bansal
 Myra Singh as Mona Bansal

Production
The film was announced in July 2019, with lead cast of Sonam Bajwa, Mehreen Pirzada, Ninja and Ajay Sarkaria.
It marked as Ajay Sarkaria's debut film.

Release 
The first look of the film was released on 17 September 2019. The official trailer of the film was released by White Hill Music on 19 September 2019. Dialogue promo was released on 4 October 2019.

The film was theatrically released on 18 October 2019.

Soundtrack 

The songs are composed by Desi Crew, Jassi Katyal, Goldboy, Beat Minister, The Kidd, Gur Sidhu and Cheetah on lyrics of Sidhu Moose Wala, Harmanjeet, Gur Sidhu, Sukh Sohal, Singa, Vicky Gill, Jassi Lokka, and Satta Vairowalia.

Reception

Critical reception 

Manpriya Singh of The Tribune praised the script as refreshing, having a good storyline and funny dialogues. Singh praised the performance of Bajwa, Ajay Sarkaria and the cameo by Navneet Nishan but concluded, "our Jatti [Bajwa] is loud and clear. This film belongs to her."

References

External links
 

2019 films
Punjabi-language Indian films
2010s Punjabi-language films
Indian romantic drama films
Films set in Punjab, India
Indian feminist films
Films scored by Jassi Katyal